A prime minister, premier or chief of cabinet is the head of the cabinet and the leader of the ministers in the executive branch of government, often in a parliamentary or semi-presidential system. Under those systems, a prime minister is not the head of state, but rather the head of government, serving under either a monarch in a democratic constitutional monarchy or under a president in a republican form of government.

In parliamentary systems fashioned after the Westminster system, the prime minister is the presiding and actual head of government and head/owner of the executive power. In such systems, the head of state or their official representative (e.g., monarch, president, governor-general) usually holds a largely ceremonial position, although often with reserve powers.

Under some presidential systems, such as South Korea and Peru, the prime minister is the leader or most senior member of the cabinet, not the head of government.

In many systems, the prime minister selects and may dismiss other members of the cabinet, and allocates posts to members within the government. In most systems, the prime minister is the presiding member and chairman of the cabinet. In a minority of systems, notably in semi-presidential systems, a prime minister is the official appointed to manage the civil service and execute the directives of the head of state.

Today, the prime minister is often, but not always, a member of the legislature or its lower house, and is expected with other ministers to ensure the passage of bills through the legislature. In some monarchies the monarch may also exercise executive powers (known as the royal prerogative) without the approval of parliament.

As well as being head of government, being prime minister may require holding other roles or posts—the prime minister of the United Kingdom, for example, is also First Lord of the Treasury and Minister for the Civil Service. In some cases, prime ministers may choose to hold additional ministerial posts (e.g. when the portfolio is critical to that government's mandate):  during the Second World War, Winston Churchill was also Minister of Defence (although there was then no Ministry of Defence). Another example is the Thirty-fourth government of Israel , when Benjamin Netanyahu at one point served as the prime minister and minister of Communications, Foreign Affairs, Regional Cooperation, Economy, Defense and Interior.

Etymology
The term "prime minister" is attested in 17th Century sources referring to Cardinal Richelieu, after he was named premier ministre to head the French royal council in 1624. The title was used alongside the principal ministre d'État ("chief minister of the state") more as a job description. After 1661, Louis XIV and his descendants refused to allow one of their ministers to be more important than the others, so the term was no longer in use.

In the 18th century in the United Kingdom, members of parliament disparagingly used the title in reference to Sir Robert Walpole (whose official title was First Lord of the Treasury). During the whole of the 18th Century, Britain was involved in a prolonged conflict with France, periodically bursting into all-out war, and Britons took outspoken pride in their "Liberty" as contrasted to the "Tyranny" of French Absolute Monarchy; therefore, being implicitly compared with Richelieu was no compliment to Walpole. Over time, however, the title became honorific and remains so in the 21st century.

History

Origins

The monarchs of England and the United Kingdom had ministers in whom they placed special trust and who were regarded as the head of the government. Examples were Thomas Cromwell under Henry VIII; William Cecil, Lord Burghley under Elizabeth I; Clarendon under Charles II and Godolphin under Queen Anne. These ministers held a variety of formal posts, but were commonly known as "the minister", the "chief minister", the "first minister" and finally the "prime minister".

The power of these ministers depended entirely on the personal favour of the monarch. Although managing the parliament was among the necessary skills of holding high office, they did not depend on a parliamentary majority for their power. Although there was a cabinet, it was appointed entirely by the monarch, and the monarch usually presided over its meetings.

When the monarch grew tired of a first minister, he or she could be dismissed, or worse: Cromwell was executed and Clarendon driven into exile when they lost favour. Kings sometimes divided power equally between two or more ministers to prevent one minister from becoming too powerful. Late in Anne's reign, for example, the Tory ministers Harley and Viscount Bolingbroke shared power.

Development

In the mid 17th century, after the English Civil War (1642–1651), Parliament strengthened its position relative to the monarch then gained more power through the Glorious Revolution of 1688 and passage of the Bill of Rights in 1689. The monarch could no longer establish any law or impose any tax without its permission and thus the House of Commons became a part of the government. It is at this point that a modern style of prime minister begins to emerge.

A tipping point in the evolution of the prime ministership came with the death of Anne in 1714 and the accession of George I to the throne. George spoke no English, spent much of his time at his home in Hanover, and had neither knowledge of, nor interest in, the details of English government. In these circumstances it was inevitable that the king's first minister would become the de facto head of the government.

From 1721, this was the Whig politician Robert Walpole, who held office for twenty-one years. Walpole chaired cabinet meetings, appointed all the other ministers, dispensed the royal patronage and packed the House of Commons with his supporters. Under Walpole, the doctrine of cabinet solidarity developed. Walpole required that no minister other than himself have private dealings with the king, and also that when the cabinet had agreed on a policy, all ministers must defend it in public, or resign. As a later prime minister, Lord Melbourne, said, "It matters not what we say, gentlemen, so long as we all say the same thing."

Walpole always denied that he was "prime minister", and throughout the 18th century parliamentarians and legal scholars continued to deny that any such position was known to the Constitution. George II and George III made strenuous efforts to reclaim the personal power of the monarch, but the increasing complexity and expense of government meant that a minister who could command the loyalty of the Commons was increasingly necessary. The long tenure of the wartime prime minister William Pitt the Younger (1783–1801), combined with the mental illness of George III, consolidated the power of the post. The title "prime minister" was first referred to on government documents during the administration of Benjamin Disraeli but did not appear in the formal British Order of precedence until 1905.

The prestige of British institutions in the 19th century and the growth of the British Empire saw the British model of cabinet government, headed by a prime minister, widely copied, both in other European countries and in British colonial territories as they developed self-government. In some places alternative titles such as "premier", "chief minister", "first minister of state", "president of the council" or "chancellor" were adopted, but the essentials of the office were the same.

Modern usage
In the late 20th century, many of the world's countries had prime ministers or equivalent ministers, holding office under either constitutional monarchies or ceremonial presidents. The main exceptions to this system include Switzerland and the United States, as well as the presidential republics in Latin America, such as Chile and Mexico, modelled on the U.S. system in which the president directly exercises executive authority.

Bahrain's former prime minister, Sheikh Khalifah bin Sulman Al Khalifah, occupied the post for about 50 years, from 1970 to November 2020, making him the longest serving non-elected prime minister.

Overview of the office

In monarchies and in republics 

The post of prime minister may be encountered both in constitutional monarchies (such as Belgium, Denmark, Japan, Luxembourg, the Netherlands, Norway, Malaysia, Morocco, Spain, Sweden, Thailand, Canada, Australia, New Zealand, and the United Kingdom) and in parliamentary republics, in which the head of state is an elected official (such as Bangladesh, Finland, the Czech Republic, France, Greece, Hungary, India, Indonesia (1945–66), Ireland, Nigeria (1960–66), Pakistan, Portugal, Montenegro, Croatia, Bulgaria, Romania, Serbia, Turkey (1923–2018) and Italy). See also "First Minister", "Premier", "Chief Minister", "Chancellor", "Taoiseach", "Minister of State (Statsminister)", "President of the Government", "President of the Council of Ministers" and "Secretary of State": alternative titles usually equivalent in meaning to, or translated as, "prime minister". Both Indonesia and Nigeria lost their positions as prime ministers in 1966. Brazil, Iran, the Philippines and Turkey also lost their positions as prime ministers. Chile, Mexico, Switzerland and the United States never had positions as prime ministers.

This contrasts with the presidential system, in which the president (or equivalent) is both the head of state and the head of the government. In some presidential and all semi-presidential systems, such as those of China, France, Russia, South Korea or Ukraine, the prime minister is an official generally appointed by the president but usually approved by the legislature and responsible for carrying out the directives of the president and managing the civil service. The premier of the Republic of China (Taiwan) is also appointed by the president, but requires no approval by the legislature.

Appointment of the prime minister of France requires no approval by the parliament either, but the parliament may force the resignation of the government. In these systems, it is possible for the president and the prime minister to be from different political parties if the legislature is controlled by a party different from that of the president. When it arises, such a state of affairs is usually referred to as (political) cohabitation.

Entry into office
In parliamentary systems a prime minister may enter into office by several means.

 The head of state appoints a prime minister, of their personal choice: Example: France, where the president has the power to appoint the prime minister of their choice, though the National Assembly can force a government to resign, they cannot nominate or appoint a new candidate.
While in practice most prime ministers under the Westminster system (including Australia, Canada, New Zealand, Malaysia, India and the United Kingdom) are the leaders of the largest party or coalition in parliament, technically the appointment of the prime minister is de jure exercised by the head of state. 
 The head of state appoints a prime minister who has a set timescale within which they must gain a vote of confidence: Example: Italy, Romania, Thailand
 The head of state appoints a formateur from among the members of Parliament, who then has a set timescale within which they must form a cabinet, and receive the confidence of Parliament after presenting the Cabinet Composition and Legislative Program to Parliament, and the formateur becomes prime minister once approved by parliament: Example: Israel
 The head of state appoints the leader of the political party with the majority of the seats in the parliament as prime minister.  If no party has a majority, then the leader of the party with a plurality of seats is given an exploratory mandate to receive the confidence of the parliament within three days.  If this is not possible, then the leader of the party with the second highest seat number is given the exploratory mandate.  If this fails, then the leader of the third largest party is given it and so on: Example: Greece, see Prime Minister of Greece
 The head of state nominates a candidate for prime minister who is then submitted to parliament for approval before appointment as prime minister: Example: Spain, where the King sends a nomination to parliament for approval. Also Germany where under the German Basic Law (constitution) the Bundestag votes on a candidate nominated by the federal president. In the Philippines under the 1973 Constitution as amended after martial law, the prime minister was elected by the Batasang Pambansâ (Legislature) upon nomination by the president. In these cases, parliament can choose another candidate who then would be appointed by the head of state (or, in the case of the Philippines, outright elect that candidate).
 Parliament nominates a candidate who the head of state is then constitutionally obliged to appoint as prime minister: Example: Ireland, where the president appoints the Taoiseach on the nomination of Dáil Éireann. Also Japan.
 Election by the legislature: Example: the Philippines under the unamended 1973 Constitution, where the prime minister was supposed to be elected by the Batasang Pambansâ; these provisions were never used because the Philippines was under martial law at the time. Also Vanuatu.
 Direct election by popular vote: Example: Israel, 1996–2001, where the prime minister was elected in a general election, with no regard to political affiliation.
 Nomination by a state office holder other than the head of state or his or her representative: Example: Under the modern Swedish Instrument of Government, the power to appoint someone to form a government has been moved from the monarch to the speaker of the parliament and the parliament itself. The speaker nominates a candidate, who is then elected to prime minister (statsminister) by the parliament if an absolute majority of the members of parliament does not vote no (i.e. he can be elected even if more MP:s vote no than yes).

Exit from office
Most prime ministers in parliamentary systems are not appointed for a specific term in office and in effect may remain in power through a number of elections and parliaments. For example, Margaret Thatcher was only ever appointed prime minister on one occasion, in 1979. She remained continuously in power until 1990, though she used the assembly of each House of Commons after a general election to reshuffle her cabinet.

Some states, however, do have a term of office of the prime minister linked to the period in office of the parliament. Hence the Irish Taoiseach is formally 'renominated' after every general election. (Some constitutional experts have questioned whether this process is actually in keeping with the provisions of the Irish constitution, which appear to suggest that a taoiseach should remain in office, without the requirement of a renomination, unless the prime minister has clearly lost the general election.) The position of prime minister is normally chosen from the political party that commands majority of seats in the lower house of parliament.

In parliamentary systems, governments are generally required to have the confidence of the lower house of parliament (though a small minority of parliaments, by giving a right to block supply to upper houses, in effect make the cabinet responsible to both houses, though in reality upper houses, even when they have the power, rarely exercise it). Where they lose a vote of confidence, have a motion of no confidence passed against them, or where they lose supply, most constitutional systems require either:

The latter in effect allows the government to appeal the opposition of parliament to the electorate. However, in many jurisdictions a head of state may refuse a parliamentary dissolution, requiring the resignation of the prime minister and his or her government. In most modern parliamentary systems, the prime minister is the person who decides when to request a parliamentary dissolution.

Older constitutions often vest this power in the cabinet. In the United Kingdom, for example, the tradition whereby it is the prime minister who requests a dissolution of parliament dates back to 1918. Prior to then, it was the entire government that made the request. Similarly, though the modern 1937 Irish constitution grants to the Taoiseach the right to make the request, the earlier 1922 Irish Free State Constitution vested the power in the Executive Council (the then name for the Irish cabinet).

In Australia, the prime minister is expected to step down if they lose the majority support of their party under a spill motion as have many such as Tony Abbott, Julia Gillard, Kevin Rudd and Malcolm Turnbull.

Organisational structure

The prime minister's executive office is usually called the Office of the Prime Minister or Cabinet Office. The U.K.’s Cabinet Office includes the Prime Minister’s Office. Conversely, some Prime Minister's Offices incorporate the role of Cabinet, while Australia’s Department of the Prime Minister and Cabinet joins them at par. In Israel, the prime minister's executive office is officially titled the "Prime Minister's Office" in English, but the original Hebrew term can also be translated as the Prime Minister's Ministry.  The Prime Minister's Department is also used, as is Cabinet Department.

Description of the role
Wilfried Martens, who served as Prime Minister of Belgium, described his role as follows:

First of all the Prime Minister must listen a lot, and when deep disagreements occur, he must suggest a solution to the matter. This can be done in different ways. Sometimes during the discussion, I note the elements of the problem and think of a proposal I can formulate to the Council (cabinet), the Secretary taking notes. The Ministers then insist on changing game ages. The Prime Minister can also make a proposal which leaves enough room for amendments in order to keep the current discussion on the right tracks. When a solution must be found in order to reach a consensus, he can force one or two Ministers to join or resign.

Cross-country comparative details

Titles
In many cases, though commonly used, "prime minister" is not the official title of the office-holder. In the Russian constitution, the prime minister is titled Chairman of the government. The head of government of the People's Republic of China is referred to as the Premier of the State Council.

Other common forms include president of the council of ministers (for example in Italy), President of the Executive Council, or Minister-President. In the Nordic countries the prime minister is called Statsminister, meaning "Minister of State". In federations, the head of government of a federated entity (such as the province or territory of Canada or the  state of Brazil) is most commonly known as the premier, chief minister, governor or minister-president.

It is convention in the English language to call nearly all national heads of government "prime minister" (or sometimes the equivalent term "premier"), except in cases where the head of state and head of government are one position (usually a presidency), regardless of the correct title of the head of government as applied in his or her respective country. The few exceptions to the rule are Germany and Austria, whose head of government's title is Federal Chancellor; Monaco, whose head of government is referred to as the Minister of State; and Vatican City, for which the head of government is titled the Secretary of State. A stand-out case is the president of Iran, who is not actually a head of state, but the head of the government of Iran. He is referred to as "president" in both the Persian and English languages.

In non-Commonwealth countries, the prime minister may be entitled to the style of Excellency like a president. In some Commonwealth countries, prime ministers and former prime ministers are styled Honourable or Right Honourable associated with their position (the prime minister of Australia or the prime minister of Canada, for example). In the United Kingdom, the prime minister and former prime ministers are also often styled Honourable or Right Honourable; however, this is not due to their position as head of government, but a privilege of being current members of His Majesty's Most Honourable Privy Council.

In the UK, where devolved government is in place, the leaders of the Scottish, Northern Irish and Welsh Governments are styled First Minister. Between 1921 and 1972, when Northern Ireland had a majority rule Parliament, the head of government was the prime minister of Northern Ireland. In Bangladesh, the prime minister is called Prodhan Montri, literally meaning "the head of ministers" or "prime minister".  In India, the prime minister is called Pradhān Mantrī, literally meaning "the head of ministers" or "prime minister". In Pakistan, the prime minister is referred to as Wazir-e-Azam, meaning "grand vizier".

Constitutional basis for the position in different countries

The position, power and status of prime ministers differ depending on the age of the constitution.

Australia's constitution makes no mention of a prime minister of Australia and the office only exists by convention, based on the British model.

Bangladesh's constitution clearly outlines the functions and powers of the prime minister, and also details the process of his/her appointment and dismissal.

The People's Republic of China constitution set a premier just one place below the National People's Congress in China. Premier read as (Simplified Chinese: 总理; pinyin: Zŏnglĭ) in Chinese.

Canada has a 'mixed' or hybrid constitution, partly formally codified and partly uncodified. The codified part originally made no reference whatsoever to a prime minister and still gives no parameters of the office. Instead, her or his powers, duties, appointment and termination follow uncodified conventions. The Constitution Act, 1867 only establishes the Queen's Privy Council for Canada, to which all federal ministers (among others) are appointed and with Members of which the Monarch or her Governor General normally performs executive government (as Queen- or Governor-in-Council). The Constitution Act, 1982, adds passing reference to the "Prime Minister of Canada" [French: ] but as detail of conferences of federal and provincial first ministers.)

Czech Republic's constitution clearly outlines the functions and powers of the prime minister of the Czech Republic, and also details the process of his/her appointment and dismissal.

France's constitution (1958) lists the powers, functions and duties of the prime minister of France.

Germany's Basic Law (1949) lists the powers, functions and duties of the federal chancellor.

Greece's constitution (1975) lists the powers, functions and duties of the prime minister of Greece.

Hungary's constitution (2012) lists the powers, functions and duties of the prime minister of Hungary.

India's constitution (1950) lists the powers, functions and duties of the prime minister of India. In India, prime ministerial candidates must be a member of parliament, i.e. of either the Lok Sabha (Lower House) or Rajya Sabha (Upper House). No parliamentary vote takes place on who forms a government.

Ireland's constitution (1937), provides for the office of Taoiseach in detail, listing powers, functions and duties.

Italy's constitution (1948) lists the powers, functions and duties of the president of the Council of Ministers.

Japan's constitution (1946) lists the powers, functions and duties of the prime minister of Japan.

The Republic of Korea's constitution (1987) sections 86–87 list the powers, functions and duties of the prime minister of the Republic of Korea.

Malta's constitution (1964) lists the powers, functions and duties of the prime minister of Malta.

Malaysia's constitution (1957) lists the powers, functions and duties of the prime minister of Malaysia.

Norway's constitution (1814) lists the powers, functions and duties of the prime minister of Norway

Pakistan's constitution (1973) lists the powers, functions and duties of the prime minister of Pakistan.

Spain's constitution (1978) regulates the appointment, dismissal, powers, functions and duties of the President of the Government.

Sri Lanka's constitution (1978) lists the powers, functions and duties of the prime minister of Sri Lanka.

Thailand's constitution (1932) lists the powers, functions and duties of the prime minister of Thailand.

Taiwan's constitution (1946) lists the powers, functions and duties of the president of the Executive Yuan.

The United Kingdom's constitution, being uncodified and largely unwritten, makes no mention of a prime minister. Though it had de facto existed for centuries, its first mention in official state documents did not occur until the first decade of the twentieth century. Accordingly, it is often said "not to exist"; indeed there are several instances of parliament declaring this to be the case. The prime minister sits in the cabinet solely by virtue of occupying another office, either First Lord of the Treasury (office in commission) or more rarely Chancellor of the Exchequer (the last of whom was Balfour in 1905).

In such systems unwritten (and unenforceable) constitutional conventions often outline the order in which people are asked to form a government. If the prime minister resigns after a general election, the monarch usually asks the leader of the opposition to form a government. Where however a resignation occurs during a parliament session (unless the government has itself collapsed) the monarch will ask another member of the government to form a government. While previously the monarch had some leeway in whom to ask, all British political parties now elect their leaders (until 1965 the Conservatives chose their leader by informal consultation). The last time the monarch had a choice over the appointment occurred in 1963 when the Earl of Home was asked to become prime minister ahead of Rab Butler.
During the period between the time it is clear that the incumbent government has been defeated at a general election, and the actual swearing-in of the new prime minister by the monarch, governor-general, or president, that person is referred to as the "prime minister-elect" or "prime minister-designate". Neither term is strictly correct from a constitutional point of view, but they have wide acceptance. In a situation in which a ruling party elects or appoints a new leader, the incoming leader will usually be referred as "prime minister-in-waiting". An example or this situation was in 2016 in the United Kingdom when Theresa May was elected leader of the Conservative Party while David Cameron was still prime minister.

Russia's constitution (1993) lists the powers, functions and duties of the prime minister of Russia.

Ukraine's constitution (1996) lists the powers, functions and duties of the prime minister of Ukraine.

Lists of prime ministers

The following table groups the list of past and present prime ministers and details information available in those lists.

See also
List of current prime ministers by date of assumption of office
Chancellor
Chief Minister
Governor-General
Head of government
Head of state
Monarch
President
Prime ministerial government

Lists
List of current heads of state and government
List of democracy and election-related topics

Notes

References

Further reading
 Andrew Blick & George Jones, Premiership: The Development, Nature and Power of the Office of the British Prime Minister (Exeter: Imprint Academic, 2010), .
 Michael Foley, The British Presidency (Manchester University Press, Manchester, 2000)
 Peter Hennessy, The Prime Minister: The Office and Its Holders Since 1945 (New York: St. Martin's Press, 2001), .
 Paul Langford, "Prime Ministers and Parliaments: The Long View, Walpole to Blair.", The Annual History of Parliament Lecture, 2005, Parliamentary History, 25, 3 (2006): 382–394, doi:10.1353/pah.2006.0045.
 Brian Carroll, Australia's Prime Ministers: From Barton to Howard (Rosenberg Publishing, 2004)
 James Manor, Nehru to the Nineties: The Changing Office of Prime Minister in India (C. Hurst & Co., 1994)
 Jagdish Chandra Sharma, Indian Prime Ministership: A Comprehensive Study (Concept Publishing Company, 2002), .

 
Heads of government
Titles
+Prime
Positions of authority
17th-century neologisms